The 2022–23 West of Scotland Football League (known as the PDM Buildbase West of Scotland League for sponsorship reasons) is the 3rd season of the West of Scotland Football League, with its top division as part of the sixth tier of the Scottish football pyramid system. The season began on 29 July 2022. Darvel are the reigning champions.

Teams

To West of Scotland Football League 
Transferred from South of Scotland Football League
 Threave Rovers

Transferred from Ayrshire Amateur Football League
 Eglinton (played 2021–22 as Kilwinning Rangers Amateurs)
Transferred from Caledonian Amateur Football League
 Thorn Athletic
Transferred from Central Scottish Amateur Football League
 West Park United

Transferred from Scottish Amateur Football League
 Easterhouse Academy (played 2021–22 as Easthall Star)

Newly established
 Rossvale Academy

From West of Scotland Football League 
Transferred to East of Scotland Football League
 Harthill Royal

Premier Division

The Premier Division reverted to a 16-team division, with Arthurlie, Cambuslang Rangers, and Petershill promoted from the tier 7 Conferences A, B & C respectively.

Stadia and locations

League table

Results

First Division
The First Division is made up of the seven teams relegated from the Premier Division, along with those finishing 2nd, 3rd, and 4th in each of the three Conferences.

League table

Results

Second Division

The Second Division consists of the clubs finishing 5th, 6th, 7th, 8th, and 9th in each of the three Conferences, plus the 10th place club with the best points per game record (Muirkirk Juniors).

League table

Results

Third Division

The Third Division features the remaining clubs from each Conference, along with Finnart who were promoted as winners of Division Four.

League table

Results

Fourth Division
The Fourth Division contains the remaining six clubs from Division Four, as well as six new teams, including Threave Rovers who have switched from the South of Scotland League.

League table

Results

Notes
 Club with an SFA licence; eligible to participate in the Lowland League promotion play-off should they win the Premier Division and take part in the Scottish Cup.

References

External links

West of Scotland Football League seasons
6
SCO
Sco6